The World Porridge Making Championship has been running since 1994, giving a main prize of the "Golden Spurtle" trophy and the title "World Porridge Making Champion" for the best traditional porridge made with oatmeal, water and salt. A prize is also awarded for the best "Speciality" porridge which again is made with oatmeal and contenders can add their own ingredients.  The competition takes place at the village hall in Carrbridge, in the Cairngorms National Park, Scotland. and is run by volunteers on behalf of the Carrbridge Community Council. It has taken place alongside World Porridge Day since 2009.

Winners

References

Porridges
Porridge
1994 establishments in Scotland
Competitions in Scotland